Seton Company, Inc. or the Seton Leather Company of Pennsylvania (SEPA) is a former manufacturer and supplier of leather products—and later brand—for automotive interiors. The company was founded in 1906 by German tanner Joespeh Kaltenbacher and was one of the largest leather suppliers for automotive upholstery. It was based in West Bloomfield, Michigan and previously headquartered in Norristown, Pennsylvania. On January 3, 2011, the company became a subsidiary of GST AutoLeather, Inc., making the world's largest seat supplier for the automotive industry.

References

External links 
http://www.setonco.com/
http://www.nacua.org/nacualert/memberversion/Unions/setonco.pdf
http://www.altoonamirror.com/page/content.detail/id/510690/Seton-will-close-its-Saxton-plant.html?nav=756
Article title
http://votesmart.org/public-statement/118735/governor-rendell-announces-seton-company-to-expand-manufacturing-operations-in-saxton#.U-FDUfldVyI

Defunct manufacturing companies based in Michigan
Defunct manufacturing companies based in Pennsylvania